Dis is an album by Norwegian jazz composer and saxophonist Jan Garbarek recorded in 1976 and released on the ECM label in 1977.

Reception
The Penguin Guide to Jazz selected this album as part of its suggested Core Collection.

Allmusic awarded the album 2 stars in a review retrieved in 2012; in a review uploaded on Allmusic in 2015, the album received a -star rating.

Track listing
All compositions by Jan Garbarek
 "Vandrere" - 13:42
 "Krusning" - 5:40
 "Viddene" - 5:44
 "Skygger" - 10:10
 "Yr" - 5:59
 "Dis" - 7:52
Recorded at Talent Studios in Oslo, Norway in December 1976

Personnel
Jan Garbarek – soprano saxophone, tenor saxophone, wood flute
Ralph Towner – 12 string guitar, classical guitar
Jan Erik Kongshaug – windharp (tracks 1,3 and 6)
Den Norske Messingsekstett – brass (track 4)

References

ECM Records albums
Jan Garbarek albums
1977 albums
Albums produced by Manfred Eicher